Moriyoshizan Dam is a rockfill dam located in Akita Prefecture in Japan. The dam is used for flood control, irrigation, water supply and power production. The catchment area of the dam is 248 km2. The dam impounds about 320  ha of land when full and can store 78100 thousand cubic meters of water. The construction of the dam was started on 1973 and completed in 2011.

References

Dams in Akita Prefecture
2011 establishments in Japan